Rakovsky is a surname. Notable people with the surname include:

Christian Rakovsky (1873–1941), Bulgarian and Soviet socialist revolutionary
Igor Rakovsky (born 1975), Russian footballer
Martin Rakovský (c. 1535–1579), Renaissance-era Hungarian poet and humanist scholar
Patrick Rakovsky (born 1993), German football player
Puah Rakovsky (1865–1955), professional educator, Zionist activist and feminist leader
Vasily Rakovsky (1898–1978), Soviet general
Zsuzsa Rakovsky (born 1950), Hungarian translator and writer

See also 
Rakovski (disambiguation)
Rakowski

Russian-language surnames
Bulgarian-language surnames